Ablepharus anatolicus is a species of skink native to Turkey.

References

External links

Ablepharus
Reptiles described in 1997
Reptiles of Turkey
Taxa named by Josef Friedrich Schmidtler